The Masters on Photonic Networks engineering (MAPNET) is a European Union Erasmus Mundus Masters programme.

Overview
The Masters study programme has 30 ECTS by semester and is divided into four semesters. In the programme the first three semesters are designed as courses, laboratory sessions, and the last semester is based an independent work for the Masters thesis. This program is offered by the four universities:
 Sant'Anna School of Advanced Studies
 Berlin Institute of Technology
 Aston University
 Osaka University

Associated members

 Ericsson - Sweden
 Deutsche Telekom - Germany
 Mitsubishi Electric - Japan
 Fujitsu - Japan
 National Institute of Information and Communications Technology - Japan

References

External links
 MAsters on Photonic NETworks Engineering (MAPNET) website

Education in Pisa
Osaka University programs